Mario Franke (born 22 January 1968) is a German former gymnast. He competed in eight events at the 1992 Summer Olympics.

References

External links
 

1968 births
Living people
German male artistic gymnasts
Olympic gymnasts of Germany
Gymnasts at the 1992 Summer Olympics
People from Sangerhausen
Sportspeople from Saxony-Anhalt